The following is a list of ecoregions in North Macedonia as identified by the World Wide Fund for Nature (WWF).

Terrestrial ecoregions
North Macedonia is in the Palearctic realm. Ecoregions are listed by biome.

Mediterranean forests, woodlands, and scrub
 Aegean and Western Turkey sclerophyllous and mixed forests
 Pindus Mountains mixed forests

Temperate broadleaf and mixed forests
 Balkan mixed forests
 Rodope montane mixed forests

Freshwater ecoregions
 Southeast Adriatic drainages
 Thrace
 Vardar

References
 Abell, R., M. Thieme, C. Revenga, M. Bryer, M. Kottelat, N. Bogutskaya, B. Coad, N. Mandrak, S. Contreras-Balderas, W. Bussing, M. L. J. Stiassny, P. Skelton, G. R. Allen, P. Unmack, A. Naseka, R. Ng, N. Sindorf, J. Robertson, E. Armijo, J. Higgins, T. J. Heibel, E. Wikramanayake, D. Olson, H. L. Lopez, R. E. d. Reis, J. G. Lundberg, M. H. Sabaj Perez, and P. Petry. (2008). Freshwater ecoregions of the world: A new map of biogeographic units for freshwater biodiversity conservation. BioScience 58:403-414, .

 
North Macedonia
Ecoregions